Suwon Central Baptist Church is an Evangelical Christian Baptist megachurch located in Suwon, South Korea, affiliated with the Korea Baptist Convention. At present, the senior pastor is Myung Jin Ko.

History
The church was founded in 1951. In 1960, Billy Kim became the senior pastor of the church which counts 10 people. In 1973, the church has 300 people. In 2005, when he retired, the church had 15,000 people. Myung Jin Ko becomes the Senior Pastor in January 2005. In 2008, the church has 20,000 people. In 2020, it would have 30,000 people.

See also
List of the largest evangelical churches
List of the largest evangelical church auditoriums
Worship service (evangelicalism)

References

External links

 .

Baptist churches in South Korea
Evangelical megachurches in South Korea